Ingmar Vos (born 28 May 1986 in Rotterdam) is a former Dutch athlete who specialised in the Decathlon and Heptathlon.

Biography
Competing at a national level since his mid teens, Vos came second in the Dutch National Youth Championships in 2003, and two years later he won the Dutch Junior A all-rounders title. As part of the Dutch team in the 2005 European Athletics Junior Championships in Kaunas he came tenth.

Becoming a Senior in 2006 Vos won a silver medal at the Dutch Championships indoor combined events and a bronze medal at the Dutch Decathlon Championships. The next year he won a bronze medal at the national indoor championships, and came eighth in the decathlon at the 2007 European Athletics U23 Championships. In 2008, Vos took part in all national championships held in the Netherlands. In order to win a place on the Dutch team for the 2009 World Athletics Championships, in Berlin, Vos competed in a number of events throughout Europe including the Hypo Meeting in Götzis, Austria, at which he came thirteenth. At the 2009 World Athletics Championships Vos finished twentieth. At the 2010 European Athletics Championships, in Barcelona, Spain he came eleventh and fifth in the Men's heptathlon at the 2011 European Athletics Indoor Championships

Vos was affiliated with two clubs, PAC Rotterdam and Ilion Zoetermeer. On June 17, 2017 Vos made public that he had retired from competition.

Achievements

References

1986 births
Living people
Dutch decathletes
Athletes (track and field) at the 2012 Summer Olympics
Olympic athletes of the Netherlands
World Athletics Championships athletes for the Netherlands
Athletes from Rotterdam